The 1970 La Flèche Wallonne was the 34th edition of La Flèche Wallonne cycle race and was held on 19 April 1970. The race started in Liège and finished in Marcinelle. The race was won by Eddy Merckx of the Faemino–Faema team.

General classification

References

1970 in road cycling
1970
1970 in Belgian sport
1970 Super Prestige Pernod